Jakob Örn Sigurðarson (born 4 April 1982) is an Icelandic basketball coach and former player. He was named the Icelandic men's basketball player of the year in 2011. Jakob won the Icelandic championship in 2000 and 2009, and the Swedish championship in 2011.

College career
He played his senior year of high school in Fort Lauderdale, Florida and played basketball at Birmingham-Southern College, Alabama.

Playing career
Jakob played in Sweden for 10 years, first with Sundsvall Dragons from 2009-2015 and then with Borås Basket until 2019.

In May 2019, Jakob returned Iceland and signed with KR along with his brother Matthías Orri Sigurðarson. On 5 January 2020, KR announced that he would miss significant time due to a slipped disk in his back.

Jakob announced his retirement from basketball following KR's loss against Keflavík in the semi-finals of the 2021 Úrvalsdeild playoffs.

National team career
Jakob debuted for the Icelandic national basketball team in 2000 and participated with them in EuroBasket 2015. In August 2016, he declared his retirement from international play. However, in November 2017, he returned to the national team and played with it until 2018. In his 18-year national team career, he played 92 games for Iceland.

Coaching career
In August 2021, Jakob was hired as an assistant coach with KR.

Personal life
Jakob is the older brother of professional basketball player Matthías Orri Sigurðarson.

References

External links
Profile at FIBA Europe
College stats at Sports-reference.com
Basketligan profile at basketliganherr.se

1982 births
Living people
Bayer Giants Leverkusen players
Birmingham–Southern Panthers men's basketball players
Borås Basket players
Jakob Sigurdarson
Jakob Sigurdarson
Jakob Sigurdarson
Jakob Sigurdarson
Jakob Sigurdarson
Jakob Sigurdarson
Jakob Sigurdarson
Jakob Sigurdarson
Jakob Sigurdarson
Point guards
Jakob Sigurðarson
Sundsvall Dragons players
Jakob Sigurdarson
Jakob Sigurdarson
Ciudad de Vigo Básquet players